Richard Dennis Herr  (born November 2, 1941) is a retired vice admiral in the United States Coast Guard who served as the 20th Vice Commandant from 1996 to 1998. He was previously Commander of the Coast Guard Pacific Area and U.S. Maritime Defense Zone Pacific, Resource Director, Comptroller, Coast Guard Chief Financial Officer, Commander of the Eleventh Coast Guard District, Commander of Joint Task Force Five, Commander of Coast Guard Air Station and Commander of Coast Guard Aviation Training Center. He is an alumnus of the United States Coast Guard Academy, Naval Postgraduate School, and National War College.

His awards include the Distinguished Service Medal, three Legions of Merit, two Meritorious Service Medals, two Coast Guard Commendation Medals, and the Coast Guard Achievement Medal. He is also a member of both the American Academy of Arts and Sciences and the American Philosophical Society. He is married to Susan Andrews and has two children.

References

Living people
United States Coast Guard admirals
Vice Commandants of the United States Coast Guard
1941 births
American chief financial officers
Members of the American Philosophical Society